Parque del Recuerdo is a private cemetery in Uruguay. 

It is located at Canelones Department, 25 km east of downtown Montevideo, on the Ruta Interbalnearia, north of Ciudad de la Costa.

History
The cemetery was established in 1993.

Notable burials
 Reinaldo Gargano (1934–2013) – Foreign Minister and Senator
 Ladislao Mazurkiewicz (1945–2013) – Association football goalkeeper and coach

References

External links
 Parque del Recuerdo
 

Cemeteries in Canelones Department
1993 establishments in Uruguay